The Few, The Proud, The Crucial is Casey Jones's first full-length release. It was released in 2004 by Indianola Records. The album uses several sound clips from Family Guy episodes; most notably "Mr. Griffin Goes to Washington", an episode about cigarette companies.

Track listing
"Just Another Day In The FLA – 1:46
"Know This X" – 1:42
"Grown Assman" – 1:49
"You Were Never A Fan Of The Dry Hump" – 1:37
"Strike Hard" – 1:58
"Dead Kid? Try A Nice Memorial Tattoo" – 1:51
"C.G.L. 2K3" – 1:29
"Meaner Than A Junkyard Dog" – 1:24
"If You’re Smoking In Here You Better Be On Fire" – 1:25
"Big Train Raging Ice"  – 1:28
"Pigs Is Pigs" – 2:01
"Pain 101" – 3:25 (contains hidden rap track)

References

Casey Jones (band) albums
2004 debut albums
Indianola Records albums